Best-Of is a greatest hits album by Anggun. The album was released in December 2006 in Indonesia, May 2007 in Malaysia and June 2007 in Italy, to celebrate the first decade of Anggun's international career. It features hit singles from her first three international studio albums, as well as her soundtrack and collaborations with other artists. Anggun also re-recorded three of her old Indonesian hits—"Mimpi", "Bayang Bayang Ilusi" and "Takut". A deluxe edition features bonus VCD and DVD were released for Indonesia and Italy.

Track listing

Indonesian / Malaysian edition

Italian edition

References

 Album Description

External links
 Anggun Official Site
 Anggunesia: Anggun Indonesian Fan Community
 Anggun World Fan Community

2006 greatest hits albums
Anggun albums